Vivisector: Beast Within is a 2005 horror first-person shooter game released by 1C. The game is set in 1987 on a covert military installation on Soreo Island, where a riot has broken out by renegade geneticist Dr. Morhead's experimental human-animal hybrid soldiers. It is the player's job to help the General suppress the riot and regain control of the hybrid soldiers. The game features "vivisection point", which allows the player to remove an enemy's flesh when shot.

History 
The game was released in Europe in 2006 and the Commonwealth of Independent States in 2005. It was originally intended to be an entry in the Duke Nukem franchise titled Duke Nukem: Endangered Species, scheduled for release in late 2001. It was largely inspired by the science fiction horror film Island of Lost Souls and the science fiction novel The Island of Doctor Moreau.

Reception 

Vivisector: Beast Within received mixed reviews.

Notes 
Some of the alternative names for Vivisector: Beast Within are Вивисектор. Зверь внутри, Vivisector: Dusza Bestii (Polish for Soul of the Beast), Vivisector: Creatures of Dr. Moreau.

References

External links 
 

2005 video games
First-person shooters
Science fiction video games
Video games developed in Ukraine
Windows games
Windows-only games
Biopunk
2000s horror video games
Video games set in 1987
Video games set on fictional islands
Single-player video games
1C Company games
Action Forms games